Kilian Fischhuber (born 1 August 1983) is a professional Austrian sport climber and rock climber. He participated in bouldering and lead climbing competitions. From 2005 to 2011, he won five Bouldering World Cups. No other male climber was ever able to win it more than three times, or win it three times in a row. Due to his outstanding career, he was awarded the La Sportiva Competition Award in 2009, together with Chris Sharma.

Biography 
Fischhuber discovered indoor sport climbing in 1995.

From 1997 to 1999 he participated in Lead climbing international youth competitions.

In 1999, when he was 16 years old, he entered the Austrian bouldering team and started competing in the Bouldering World Cup, winning his first bronze medal in 2003 and his first gold in 2004.

He won the Bouldering World Cup five times, in 2005, 2007, 2008, 2009, and 2011. No other climber was ever able to win it more than three times, and no other climber was able to win it three times in a row (Jérôme Meyer won it in 2001, 2003, 2006).

At the end of 2014 he announced his retirement from competitions.

Rankings

Climbing World Cup

Climbing World Championships

Climbing European Championships

Number of medals in the Climbing World Cup

Bouldering

Rock climbing

Boulder problems 

Single-pitch routes 
:
 Action directe - Frankenjura (DEU) - 26 September 2006 - Ninth ascent
 Underground - Massone (Arco, ITA) - 2005 - First ascent by Manfred Stuffer, 1998

:
 Bumaye  - Margalef (ESP) - 2010
 Dolby Surround - Zillertal (AUT) - 2008
 Sanjski Par Extension - Misja Pec - 2006
 Alien Carnage - Castillon, Alpes-Maritimes (FRA) - 2006
 Bah Bah Black Sheep - Céüse (FRA) - 2005
 Za stara kolo... - Misja Pec (SVN) - 2004
 Biographie - Céüse (FRA) - 2003

Multi-pitch routes 
 Des Kaisers neue Kleider - Wilder Kaiser (AUT) - 28 September 2009 - First ascent by Stefan Glowacz, 1994

See also
List of grade milestones in rock climbing
History of rock climbing
Rankings of most career IFSC gold medals

References

External links 

1983 births
Living people
Austrian rock climbers
People from Waidhofen an der Ybbs
Sportspeople from Lower Austria
20th-century Austrian people
21st-century Austrian people
IFSC Climbing World Championships medalists
IFSC Climbing World Cup overall medalists
Boulder climbers